Rufus C. Henderson (1779 – April 5, 1847) was a physician, merchant and political figure in Upper Canada. He represented Grenville in the Legislative Assembly of Upper Canada from 1828 to 1830 as a Conservative.

Henderson married Ann Jones, the daughter of Solomon Jones. He served as a surgeon in the militia during the War of 1812. Henderson was a justice of the peace for the Johnstown District. He died in Augusta Township, Canada West.

References

Further reading 
Becoming Prominent: Leadership in Upper Canada, 1791-1841, J.K. Johnson (1989)

1779 births
1847 deaths
Members of the Legislative Assembly of Upper Canada
Canadian justices of the peace